Mawson (also known as Bawzaing) was a Shan state in the Myelat region of what is today Burma. Its capital was Myogyi. Its population consisted of Danu, Pa-O, and Taungyo.

References

Shan States